The Monocystinae are a subfamily of parasitic alveolates in the phylum Apicomplexa.

Taxonomy

There are seven genera in this subfamily.

The type genus is Monocystis.

History

This subfamily was created by Bütschli in 1882 and modified by Bhatia in 1930.

Description

The species in this subfamily are cylindroid in shape with a mucron at the anterior end.

The trophozoites are solitary.

Syzygy occurs late in the life cycle.

They parasitise the coelom of earthworms and are spread by the orofaecal route.

References

Bikont subfamilies
Conoidasida